Chilakalapudi Seeta Rama Anjaneyulu (11 July 1907 – 8 October 1963), popularly known as C. S. R., was an Indian method actor, and thespian best known for his works in Telugu cinema, and Telugu theater. He acted in many stage dramas and portrayed lead characters and mythological roles in over 175 movies. He was one of the lead actors of his time. Anjaneyulu was an established lead actor by the late 1930s, preceding the entrance of actors such as NTR and ANR. His performance in the super-hit Bhaktha Ramadasu in 1937 won him many accolades. In the 1950s, starting with Pathala Bhairavi screened at the first International Film Festival of India, he began acting in character roles. In Pathala Bhairavi, he plays a king worried about his daughter, a princess kidnapped by a wicked magician played by Ranga Rao.

He was noted for portraying mythological and historical roles such as Krishna, Ramadasu, Sarangadhara, Bhavani Sankar, Tukaram and Satyavantha. He also acted as Lord Venkateswara in Sri Venkateswara Mahatyam, one of director P. Pulliah's first successful films. In the 1953 film Devadasu, he portrayed an aged widower zamindar, alongside Savitri, who acts as his wife. His other acclaimed character roles include Sakuni (a character from Mahabharatha) in Mayabazar. His other acclaimed acting credits include Rojulu Marayi, Gruhapravesam, Illarikam, Kanyasulkam and Appu Chesi Pappu Koodu. His directorial credits include the 1939 allegorical melodrama, Jayapradha.

Early life
He was born on 11 July 1907 in a Telugu family at Chilakalapudi near Machilipatnam in Andhra Pradesh. His father, Lakshmi Narasimha Murthy, used to work in Revenue department. He later moved to Ponnur in Guntur district. After school final studies, he worked as a co-operative supervisor for some time. Instead of pursuing further studies, he choose to enter the field of drama. In a short time, he reached a position comparable to Sthanam Narasimha Rao, D. V. Subba Rao, Parupalli, Addanki and others.

He played Sri Krishna in Sri Krishna Tulabaram and Radhakrishna, Ramadas in Bhakta Ramadasu and Tukaram in Bhakta Tukaram, which got him wide recognition. He was also a natural singer, particularly in poems. He was a national activist. He directed and produced Patita Pavana, a drama on Untouchability. He contributed  to the Indian National Army of Subhas Chandra Bose collected through donations by playing his Tukaram drama.

Personal life
He had two younger sisters and two younger brothers. One brother, C. S. Nageswara Rao, was the assistant director for movies including Suvarna Sundari, Gunasundari Katha and Mayabazar. Another brother, C. Venkata Rathnam (better known as C. V. Rathnam), was with Bharani Pictures & Studios and was the production manager for all the films produced by actress Bhanumathi Ramakrishna.

Filmography

References

External links 

Male actors in Telugu cinema
1907 births
1963 deaths
Telugu film directors
People from Machilipatnam
20th-century Indian male actors
Male actors from Andhra Pradesh
Telugu male actors
Indian male stage actors
Andhra University alumni
Indian male film actors
Film directors from Andhra Pradesh
Male actors in Malayalam cinema
20th-century Indian film directors